Lihing is a type of Malaysian rice wine that originated from the state of Sabah. It was made from "pulut", a glutinous rice and is a traditional rice wine for the Kadazan-Dusun people. The rice wine is also referred as hiing (in certain Dusun dialects), kinarung, kinomol, kinopi, linahas, sagantang as well tapai. They are different from one another, but all are made from rice-based drinks. Lihing is sold widely in Sabah including in some major hotels.

The wine is also usually used in the making of Tuaran mee, and has recently been used to make ice cream, and served during the Kaamatan festival.

Gallery

References

Further reading 
 How to Make Lihing on Flying Dusun

Rice wine
Malaysian alcoholic drinks
Alcoholic drinks